This is a list of the 12 departments of Benin by Human Development Index as of 2023 with data for the year 2021.

See also 

 List of countries by Human Development Index

References 

Human Development Index
Benin
Benin, Human Development Index